Vidarbha Rajya Nirman Congress is a political party in the Indian state of Maharashtra. VRNC works for statehood for the Vidarbha region.

VRNC was launched by two former Congress Party union ministers, Vasant Sathe and N. K. P. Salve, on August 18, 2003 and is also a member of the National Front for New States.

See also 

 Indian National Congress breakaway parties

References

Political parties in Maharashtra
Defunct political parties in Maharashtra
2003 establishments in Maharashtra
Political parties established in 2003